Michael Carr (born September 25, 1959) is a retired professional ice hockey player.

Career
Carr joined the Lowell ice hockey program in 1979 after the team won its first National Championship. As a freshman he led the team in scoring and helped the program reach the conference championship. The squad returned to the national tournament but was stifled in the semifinal and finished the tournament in 3rd place. His scoring numbers dropped by 14 points as a sophomore but the team won its first East Division title. After capturing their second consecutive ECAC 2 East Tournament championship the Chiefs beat Mankato State and Plattsburgh State in two 1-goal games to capture the 1981 national championship. Carr earned a spot on the All-Tournament team for his efforts.

Carr increased his scoring numbers by 20 points for his junior season, helping the team win its first regular season conference championship by going 19–1 in ECAC 2 play. He finished second in the nation in scoring, 3 points behind teammate Ken Kaiser, and led the team to its second consecutive conference championship and national title. Carr was named captain of the squad in his senior season and led the team to an undefeated record in conference play, earning its second regular season title. After winning their third consecutive ECAC 2 tournament the #1 team in the nation was expected to repeat as national champions but bas shut down by RIT in the semifinal and had to settle for third place.

In Carr's four years with Lowell they reached the ECAC 2 championship game and the NCAA tournament each season, finishing with 3 conference titles and 2 national titles. Carr ended his college career as the all-time goal scoring leader at the Division II level with 134 goals in 121 games.

After graduating Carr played briefly for SaiPa in SM-liiga, the top level for Finnish hockey. He returned to North America and played for another three seasons in the Ontario senior league before hanging up his skates.

He was inducted into the Massachusett–Lowell athletic hall of fame in 1988.

Career statistics

Awards and honors

References

External links
 

1959 births
Living people
Canadian ice hockey centres
Ice hockey people from Ontario
SaiPa players
Sportspeople from Burlington, Ontario
UMass Lowell River Hawks men's ice hockey players